The 2014–15 Notre Dame Fighting Irish women's basketball team will represent University of Notre Dame during the 2014–15 NCAA Division I women's basketball season. The Fighting Irish, led by twenty-eighth year head coach Muffet McGraw, play their home games at the Purcell Pavilion at the Joyce Center and were second year members of the Atlantic Coast Conference.

By edging South Carolina 66–65 in the Final Four the Irish got a rematch of last year's championship game vs. Connecticut. Like last year things didn't go well for the Irish after trailing 31–23 at the half; they were outscored 32–30 in the 2nd half and ended up 63–53 losers.

2014–15 Roster

Media
All Notre Dame games were aired on WHPZ Pulse 96.9 FM. Games were streamed online live.

Schedule

|-
!colspan=9 style="background:#002649; color:white;"|Exhibition

|-
!colspan=9 style="background:#002649; color:white;"|Regular Season

|-
!colspan=9 style="background:#002649; color:white;"| ACC Women's Tournament

|-
!colspan=9 style="background:#002649; color:white;"| 2015 NCAA Women's Tournament

Source

Rankings
2014–15 NCAA Division I women's basketball rankings

See also
2014–15 Notre Dame Fighting Irish men's basketball team

References

Notre Dame Fighting Irish women's basketball seasons
Notre Dame
Notre
NCAA Division I women's basketball tournament Final Four seasons
Notre Dame Fighting Irish
Notre Dame Fighting Irish